Chongzuo is a prefecture-level city in the south of Guangxi Zhuang Autonomous Region near the Sino-Vietnamese border. It is home to one of China's largest Zhuang populations.

Geography and climate 
Chongzuo is located in southwestern Guangxi Zhuang Autonomous Region. It borders Nanning to the east, Baise to the north, Fangchenggang to the south and Lạng Sơn, Vietnam to the west. The Zuo or Left River and the You or Right River have their confluence in Chongzuo after which the river becomes the Yong River. Chongzuo is mountainous and hilly with numerous karst formations similar to Guilin and northern Vietnam’s Ha Long Bay.

Chongzuo's climate is humid subtropical and monsoon-influenced. There are 330 frost-free days. Annual precipitation is between 1088-1799mm.

History

Chongzuo is one of the earliest centers of Zhuang culture. Important sites dating back to the stone age have been found here. The Rock Paintings of Hua Mountain along the Ming River at Huashan date back 1800 to 2500 year and are one of the largest groups of pictographs in China and in the world. On several cliff faces are hundreds of large red pictographs depicting a large battle. The red pigment is still bright and vivid and individual figures, weapons, and animals are easy to distinguish. The cliffs, part of the sacred Frog Mountain, were important site to the early Zhuang.

In 214 BC, during the Qin dynasty, Chongzuo was part of the Xiang commandry. Chinese general Feng Zicai beat back a French attack here at the Battle of Bang Bo in 1885. Sun Yat-sen fired the first cannon shot of the anti-Qing revolution in Chongzuo in 1907. In the 1930s, after fomenting rebellion in other parts of Guangxi, Deng Xiaoping helped organize the peasants and workers here during the Longzhou rebellion and eventually formed the Red Army's 8th Army. Later, in 1979, the Chinese army invaded Vietnam from here.

Administration
Chongzuo has 1 district, 1 county-level city, 5 counties, 57 towns, 72 townships, 146 residential communities, and 1,724 villages.

District:

 Jiangzhou District

County-level city:
 Pingxiang City

Counties:
 Fusui County
 Daxin County
 Tiandeng County
 Ningming County
 Longzhou County

Demographics
Chongzuo's population is 2,347,700. 88% of the people belong to the Zhuang ethnic group. The rest include Han, Yao, and other ethnic groups.

 These figures are based on the following official statistics:

Economy

Forestry and agriculture are two of Chongzuo's biggest industries. Oranges, rice, beans, corn, cassava, cinnamon, bananas, vegetables, durian, pineapples, longan, and tea are all major crops, but sugarcane is the center of Chongzuo agriculture. Farm raised animals include beef and dairy cattle, sheep, ducks, chickens, geese, and bees. Aquaculture for fish is also big. Chinese medicinal herbs are picked from the wild and also grown. Important mineral resources include manganese, gold, ferberite, coal, barite, bentonite, uranium, and vanadium. It is China's biggest manganese producer and the world's biggest producer of bentonite. Other industries include export infrastructure, paper, forest products such as timber and turpentine, building materials, pharmaceuticals, and electronics manufacturing.

Flora and fauna
Chongzuo has amazing biodiversity with more than 4000 species of plants and more than 450 kinds of animals. There are more than 30 rare and protected animals including white headed and Indo-Chinese black langurs, crested striped hornbills, pangolins, and clouded leopards. 1/4 of China’s wild animal species can be found in Chongzuo.

Tourism

Chongzuo is famous for its beautiful natural scenery. The most famous attraction is Detian Waterfall in Daxing County along the border with Vietnam. It is the second largest waterfall along a national border after Niagara Falls and was one of the crossing points for China’s army during the brief Sino-Vietnamese War. Nearby there is the Tongling Gorge accessible only through a cavern from an adjoining gorge. Rediscovered only recently, it has many species of endemic plants, found only in the gorge, and used to be used as a hideout by local bandits whose treasure is occasionally still found in the cliff-side caves. West of Chongzuo city, there are several forest and animal preserves, some with minor tourist facilities.

Zhirendong 
These findings might give some support to the claim that modern humans from Africa arrived at southern China about 100,000 years BP (Zhiren Cave, Mulanshan), Chongzuo City: 100,000 years BP; and the Liujiang hominid: controversially dated at 139,000–111,000 years BP).

Notable people
 Tan Haoming (1871–1925) - a member of the Old Guangxi Clique, born in Chongzuo Longzhou County, Zhuang.
 Huang Xianfan (1899–1982) - a Chinese historian, ethnologist and educator, born in Chongzuo Fusui County, Zhuang.

See also
 Detian – Ban Gioc Falls

References

External links
 

 
Cities in Guangxi
Prefecture-level divisions of Guangxi